Aradka is a village in Ajmer tehsil of Ajmer district of Rajasthan state in India. The village falls under Aradka gram panchayat.

Demography
As per 2011 census of India, Aradka has population of 2,233 of which 1,106 are males and 1,027 are females. Sex ratio of the village is 929.

Transportation
Aradka is connected by air (Kishangarh Airport), by train (Ajmer Junction railway station) and by road.

See also
Ajmer Tehsil
Babayacha, Ajmer

References

Villages in Ajmer district